The Assembly of Experts, also translated as the Assembly of Experts of the Leadership or as the Council of Experts, is the deliberative body empowered to appoint the Supreme Leader of Iran. All directly elected members must first be vetted by the Guardian Council.

All candidates to the Assembly of Experts must be approved by the Guardian Council whose members are, in turn, appointed either directly or indirectly by the Supreme Leader. The Assembly consists of 88 Mujtahids that are elected from lists of thoroughly vetted candidates (in 2016 166 candidates were approved by the Guardians out of 801 who applied to run for the office), by direct public vote for eight-year terms. The number of members has ranged from 82 elected in 1982 to 88 elected in 2016. Current laws require the assembly to meet at least twice every six months.

Functions

In the constitution
According to Article 111 of the Iranian Constitution, the assembly is in charge of supervising, dismissing and electing the Supreme Leader.

Whenever the Leader becomes incapable of fulfilling his constitutional duties, or loses one of the qualifications mentioned in Articles 5 and 109, or it becomes known that he did not possess some of the qualifications initially, he will be dismissed. The authority of determination in this matter is vested with the experts specified in Article 108. In the event of the death, or resignation or dismissal of the Leader, the experts shall take steps within the shortest possible time for the appointment of the new Leader. ... Whenever the Leader becomes temporarily unable to perform the duties of leadership owing to his illness or any other incident, then during this period, the council mentioned in this Article shall assume his duties.

To choose the Supreme Leader, the Experts review qualified candidates and consult among themselves. According to the Constitution, the criteria of qualification for the office of the Supreme Leader include "Islamic scholarship, justice, piety, right political and social perspicacity, prudence, courage, administrative facilities and adequate capability for leadership." The jurist deemed as the most well-versed in Islamic regulations, in fiqh, or in political and social issues, most generally popular, or of other special prominence is chosen as Supreme Leader. Otherwise, in the absence of such a candidate, the Experts elect and declare one of their own as Supreme Leader.

Article 107 of the constitution states:
the task of appointing the Leader shall be vested with the experts elected by the people. The experts will review and consult among themselves concerning all the fuqaha' possessing the qualifications specified in 
Articles 5 and 109. In the event they find one of them better versed in Islamic regulations, the subjects of the fiqh, or in political and social issues, or possessing general popularity or special prominence for any of the qualifications mentioned in Article 109, they shall elect him as the Leader. Otherwise, in the absence of such a superiority, they shall elect and declare one of them as the Leader. The Leader thus elected by the Assembly of Experts shall assume all the powers of the wilayat al-amr and all the responsibilities arising therefrom. 

Article 99 of the constitution declares "The Guardian Council has the responsibility of supervising the elections of the Assembly of Experts for Leadership". It also had the responsibility for setting up the first Assembly. The constitution does not specify requirements for candidacy for the Assembly of Experts, leaving the Assembly itself to put limits on who may run for membership. Article 108 states: 
The law setting out the number and qualifications of the experts [mentioned in the preceding article], the mode of their election, and the code of procedure regulating the sessions during the first term must be drawn up by the fuqaha' on the first Guardian Council, passed by a majority of votes and then finally approved by the Leader of the Revolution. The power to make any subsequent change or a review of this law, or approval of all the provisions concerning the duties of the experts is vested in themselves. 

The 1989 Iranian constitutional referendum removed the requirement for the leader to be a marja'. Ali Khamenei was not a marja' at that time.

Limits of power
How much actual power the Assembly has to supervise or oversee the Supreme Leader has been questioned. 
The assembly has never dismissed or even questioned a sitting Supreme Leader and, as all of its meetings and notes are strictly confidential, it has never been known to challenge or otherwise publicly oversee any of the Supreme Leader's decisions. All candidates to the Assembly (as well as the President and the Majlis or Parliament), are selected by the Guardian Council, half of whose members are selected by the Supreme Leader. Also, all directly elected members after the vetting process by the Guardian Council still have to be approved by the Supreme Leader.  

Furthermore, there have been instances of Supreme Leader Ali Khamenei publicly criticizing members of the Assembly, resulted in that members arrest and an end to their time on the Assembly -- an example being Khamenei's denouncing of then-member of the Assembly Ahmad Azari Qomi as a "traitor" after the publishing of an open letter by Qomi criticizing Khamenei, resulting in Qomi's arrest and the eventual rejection by the Guardian Council of his candidacy for re-election to the Assembly.

Other rules
The assembly gathers every six months. Activities of the assembly include compiling a list of those eligible to become Supreme Leader in the event of the current Supreme Leader's death, resignation, or dismissal. This is done by the 107/109 commission. Monitoring the current leader to make sure he continues to meet all the criteria listed in the constitution is done by the 111 commission. Members of the Assembly report to this commission about the issues concerning the current Supreme Leader, and the commission can then order an emergency meeting of the Assembly. If the commission denies this, the members can ask the entire plenary of the Assembly (86 members) for a vote, and if most of the members vote in favor, an emergency meeting will be scheduled to discuss the current Supreme Leader. The meetings, meeting notes, and reports of the Assembly are confidential and not made available to anyone outside the assembly, except for the sitting Supreme Leader.

The assembly has passed laws to require all its members be experts in fiqh (Islamic jurisprudence), authorizing the Guardian Council to vet candidates for ijtihad proficiency using written and oral examinations. This law was challenged by the reformists, and their 2006 election campaign included changing this law to allow non-clerics into the assembly, and reforming the law that allows Guardian Council to vet candidates. Women (Mujtahidehs) are theoretically eligible to run for the Assembly of Experts and in 1998 nine women submitted their candidacy. The Guardian Council rejected them, arguing that they lacked qualifications in fiqh.

Currently, the average age of the members of the Assembly is over 60 years, which results in many mid-term elections due to deaths and resignations. The members must be Ayatollahs, that is not the case, however, for Mohsen Esmaeili.

Assemblies

First Assembly (1983–1991)
The first elections for the Assembly of Experts of the Leadership were held in December 1982 and the Assembly first convened in 1983. 76 of the total of 83 members were elected in the first round, the rest in the second. The full list of members and election results is available on the Princeton Iran Data Portal.

As a number of members died, by-elections for replacement candidates were held in April 1988.

The Assembly was chaired throughout the term by Ayatollah Ali Meshkini, who chaired the Assembly also in subsequent terms until 2007.

In 1985, the Assembly chose Ayatollah Montazeri as the successor to Supreme Leader Grand Ayatollah Khomeini. But on Sunday, 26 March 1989 Khomeini dismissed him in a letter: "[...]you are no longer eligible to succeed me as the legitimate leader of the state." Following the death of Ruhollah Khomeini on 3 June 1989, the Assembly of Experts chose Ali Khamenei to be his successor as Supreme Leader in what proved to be a smooth transition. Initially, a council of three members, "Ali Meshkini, Mousavi Ardabili and Ali Khamenei", were proposed for Leadership. After rejection of a Leadership Council by the assembly, and lack of votes for Grand Ayatollah Mohammad-Reza Golpaygani, Khamenei became the Supreme Leader by two-thirds of the votes.

Second Assembly (1991–1999)
The Second Assembly was also chaired by Ayatollah Ali Meshkini. The full list of members and election results is available on the Princeton Iran Data Portal. Sayed Mohammad Fagheh was one of the members from the province Neyriz Fars.

Third Assembly (1999–2007)
The 3rd assembly was again chaired by Ayatollah Ali Meshkini, deputied by Ali Akbar Hashemi Rafsanjani, and Ayatollah Ebrahim Amini. The scribes were former Minister of Intelligence Ghorbanali Dorri-Najafabadi and Ahmad Khatami. The members according to each province were:

Tehran:

 Ali Akbar Hashemi Rafsanjani
 Meshkini, Ali Akbar
 Mohammad Mohammadi Reyshahri
 Mohammad Imami Kashani
 Mohammad Yazdi
 Ahmad Jannati
 Mohammad Reza Tavassoli
 Ghorbanali Dorri-Najafabadi
 Mohammad Taghi Mesbah Yazdi
 Majid Ansari
 Asadi Khansari, Agha Baqer
 Mohsen Kharrazi
 Mohammad Mohammadi Gilani
 Mohsen Qomi
 Reza Ostadi
 Gholam Reza Rezvani

East Azarbaijan:

 Mojtahed Shabestari, Mohsen
 Seyed Reyhani, Seyed Abolfazl
 Hashemzadeh Harisi, Hashem
 Ahmadi, Ali
 Oroumian, Ali

West Azarbaijan:

 Ghaffari Gharebagh, Mir-Akbar
 Pour-Mir Ghaffari, Seyed Mohsen
 Ghoreishi, Mir-Ali Akbar

Isfahan:

 Yasrebi, seyed Mehdi
 Mazaheri Tehrani, Mirza Hossein
 Hashemi, Seyed Esmail
 Moqtadaie, Morteza
 Mahdavi, Abolhasan

Ardabil:

 Khalilzadeh, Bouck Agha ( died & Replaced By Seyyed Hatami, Mir Ebrahim)
 Nourani Taqi Deizaj, Mostafa

Ilam:

 Mohammadi, Rahim

Bushehr:

 Abdonnabi Namazi

Chahar-Mahaal and Bakhtiari Province:

 Haj Amini Najaf Abadi, Ebrahim

Khorasan:

 Ebadi, Seyed Mehdi
 Khazali, Abolghasem
 Hashemi Shahrodi, Seyed Mahmod
 Masomi, Ali Asqar
 Ferdosi Pour, Esmail
 Mehman Navaz, Habiboallah
 Abbas Vaeze Tabasi
 Alami, Hasan

Khouzestan:

 Shafei, Seyed Ali
 Mousavi, Seyed Mohammad Ali
 Abbasi Fard, Mohammad Reza
 Ali Fallahian
 Abbas Kabi Nasab
 Mohammadi Araghi, Mohsen

Zanjan:

 Mousavi, Seyed Esmail

Semnan:

 Alami, Mohammad Ali

Sistan va Balouchestan:

 Hosseyni, Seyed Mojtaba
 Madani, Mohammad Eshaq

Fars:

 Dastqeib, Seyed Ali Asqar
 Dastqeib, Seyed Ali Mohammad
 Beheshti, Ahmad
 Hosseyni, Seyed Mohammad Hossein
 Imani, Asadollah

Qom:

 Seyed Rohani, Agha Mehdi

Qazvin:

 Mousavi Pour, Seyed Hasan
 Sheikh Mohammadi, Ali

Kurdistan:

 Sheikholleslami, Mohammad
 Abdolqader Zahedi

Kermanshah:

 Ahmadi, Zekrollah
 Zarandi, Hossein

Kerman:

 Seyed Ahmad Khatami
 Hashemian, Mohammad
 Mohammad Ali Movahedi

Kohgiluyeh and Buyer Ahmad:

 Malek Hosseyni, Seyed Keramatollah

Golestan:

 Noor Mofidi, Seyed Kazem
 Taheri, Seyed Habibollah

Gilan:

 Aminian, Mokhtar
 Mahfoozi, Abbas
 Ghorbani, Zeinolabedin
 Taskhiri, Mohammad Ali

Lorestan:

 Taheri Khorram Abadi, Seyed Hasan
 Shahrokhi, Seyed Mohammad Taqi

Markazi:

 Mohseni Garakani, Ahmad
 Mir-Mohammadi, Seyed Abolfazl

Mazandaran:

 Jabbari, Seyed Saber(died)
 Sadeq Ardeshir Larijani
 Karimi Kalabi, Seyed Jafar
 Rohani Rad, Hadi

Hormozgan:

 Anvari, Mirza Mohammad

Hamedan:

 Saberi Hamedani, Ahmad
 Dabestani, Seyed Abolhasan

Yazd:

 Khatam Yazdi, Abbas Agha

Fourth Assembly (2007–2016)

The election for the fourth assembly took place on 15 December 2006 and the Assembly first convened on 19 February 2007. In July 2007, chairman Ayatollah Meshkini died, and Ayatollah Rafsanjani was elected to succeed him. On 8 March 2011, Ayatollah Mohammad-Reza Mahdavi Kani replaced Ayatollah Rafsanjani as chairman. On 4 June 2014, Mahdavi Kani fell into a coma after suffering a heart attack and died on 21 October 2014. He was succeeded by Mahmoud Hashemi Shahroudi as acting chairman.

The term was intended to last for ten years, rather than the usual eight, due to the "election aggregation" plan of the government put in place to allow the government to run elections simultaneously for the Assembly of Experts and the Parliament, thereby economizing election administration costs.

Fifth Assembly (2016–present)

The election of 88 members of the Fifth Assembly took place on 26 February 2016 alongside of the election for 290 members of the Iranian Majlis (parliament). Those elected will sit for a projected 8-year term. The new assembly was opened on 24 May 2016 and selected Ahmad Jannati as chairman of the Fifth Assembly.

Authority
The Assembly has never dismissed or even questioned the Supreme Leader. Due to Ali Khamenei's lengthy, unchallenged reign, many believe that the Assembly of Experts has become a ceremonial body without any real power. Iran's then-Chief Justice Sadeq Larijani, a Khamenei appointee, has stated that it is illegal for the Assembly of Experts to supervise Khamenei.

There have been instances when the current Supreme Leader's public criticism of members of the Assembly of Experts was followed by their arrest and dismissal. For example, Khamenei publicly called member of the Assembly of Experts Ahmad Azari Qomi a traitor, resulting in Qomi's arrest and eventual dismissal from the Assembly of Experts. Another instance is when Khamenei indirectly called the late Akbar Hashemi Rafsanjani a traitor for a statement he made, causing Rafsanjani to retract it. Mehdi Karroubi, who has been under house arrest since 2011 without trial, by the direct order of Khamenei, said that "the Assembly of Experts, a council of elected clerics charged with electing, supervising and even disqualifying the Supreme Leader, has turned into a ceremonial council that only praises the Leader".

See also
2020 list of members of the Council of Experts
List of members in the First Term of the Council of Experts
List of members in the Second Term of the Council of Experts
List of members in the Third Term of the Council of Experts
List of members in the Fourth Term of the Council of Experts

References

External links

Princeton Iran Data Portal: List of Election Results for all years, including breakdown by province
Assembly of Experts in the Constitution of Islamic Republic of Iran
Understanding Iran's Assembly of Experts from Durham University
Results of Assembly of Experts elections in 6 provinces
Results of Assembly of Experts elections in four provinces
Results of Assembly of Experts elections in some provinces
Iran Electoral Archive – Assembly of Experts

 
Electoral colleges
Politics of Iran
Government of the Islamic Republic of Iran
Law of Iran